Uttamrao Deorao Patil (1944-2012) was an Indian politician. His father was elected as MLA From Darwha twice in 1952 & 1957 And MP from Yavatmal twice in 1962 & 1967 . He himself was elected to Maharashtra Vidhan Sabha from Digras in 1972. He represented Yavatmal  constituency, which is in the state of Maharashtra, in Lok Sabha, as a member of Indian National Congress, from 1980 to 1996, and 1998 to 2004, winning six elections in that span. He did not contest the 1996 Lok Sabha election. In 2004 elections, he was defeated by Harisingh Rathod of BJP.In November 2011, he quit Congress, complaining that his supporters were getting sidelined, and joined NCP. He died four months later.

References

External links
 Official biographical sketch in Parliament of India website

1944 births
Indian National Congress politicians
Lok Sabha members from Maharashtra
India MPs 1980–1984
India MPs 1984–1989
India MPs 1989–1991
India MPs 1991–1996
India MPs 1998–1999
India MPs 1999–2004
2012 deaths
People from Yavatmal district
Nationalist Congress Party politicians